Vivienne Lola Price  (9 January 1931 – 6 November 2014) was a British music teacher and the founder of the National Children's Orchestra in 1978. In 1959, she and her husband Tony Carter bought Fitznells Manor in Ewell, Surrey, and formed the Fitznells School of Music, running it on the ground floor while living upstairs. When the house was sold in 1988 the music school was moved to Ewell Castle School.

References

1931 births
2014 deaths
British music educators
Members of the Order of the British Empire